Stratocumulus lenticularis is an uncommon cloud type that belongs to the stratocumulus cloud type, its appearance is that of a flat lens or almond. It forms as a result of gravity waves  caused by wind passing over obstacles; for example, a mountain or a building. They are more common in locations that are hilly, or places where foehn winds are common
They tend to look more well-defined when a foehn wind is causing their formation. They also sometimes show iridescence. It is a type of lenticular cloud.

See also 
 Altocumulus lenticularis
 Cirrocumulus lenticularis

References

Cumulus
Stratus